Chaetocarpeae is a tribe of plant of the family Euphorbiaceae. It comprises 2 genera.

See also
 Taxonomy of the Euphorbiaceae

References

Acalyphoideae
Euphorbiaceae tribes
Historically recognized angiosperm taxa